Alfred Kofi Osei (born 7 July 1988) is a Ghanaian footballer who currently plays as a defender for Filipino side Kaya–Iloilo.

Career statistics

Club

Notes

References

1988 births
Living people
Ghanaian footballers
Ghanaian expatriate footballers
Association football defenders
Expatriate footballers in the Philippines
Kaya F.C. players